Kalju may refer to:
 Kalju, Lääne County, village in Kullamaa Parish, Lääne County
 Kalju, Saare County, village in Valjala Parish, Saare County
 Kalju (given name), Estonian male given name
 JK Nõmme Kalju, football club based in Nõmme, Tallinn

See also

 Kallu (name)
 Kilju, Finnish home-made alcoholic beverage